Impressed by the German airborne force during the 1940 Battle of France, the British Prime Minister, Winston Churchill, ordered the creation of a paratrooper force of 5,000 men. The success of Operation Colossus, a small scale commando raid, prompted further expansion of this force, and resulted in an additional requirement for a glider force of 10,000 men to be created. The recruitment for the size of this force took through to 1943, by which time two divisions had been formed. The airborne division was to comprise three brigades: two parachute brigades, each with three battalions from the Parachute Regiment, and an airlanding brigade with three infantry battalions. The first parachute battalions were formed from volunteers from across the British military. As the airborne force grew, infantry battalions were selected to be converted into parachute battalions. The men were invited to volunteer for parachute service, or assigned to a new unit. The new battalions were then brought up to strength from volunteers from other units. The airlanding battalions came from existing infantry units that had been converted into this new role, and the soldiers did not have the ability to opt-out. The latter were flown into battle via gliders, while the former parachuted in.

Airlanding

Parachute

See also 
 British Army during the Second World War
 Chindits, who also used parachute and glider insertions
 List of British deception formations in World War II, for brigades that were created as part of deception divisions
 List of Indian Army Brigades in World War II, for British Indian Army airborne formations

Notes

References

 
 
 
 
 
 
 

British airborne brigades
Airborne brigades
Airborne brigades
Airborne brigades